Cathy Lee Crosby (born December 2, 1944) is an American actress and former professional tennis player. She achieved TV and film success in the 1980s and was a co-host of the television series That's Incredible!

Early life
Crosby was born in Los Angeles, the middle daughter of three. Her father, Louis Clayton Crosby, was a scriptwriter-songwriter (he was also the National Commercial Spokesman for Dodge Automobiles on The Lawrence Welk Show),  and her mother, Linda Hayes, was "an RKO contract actress in the 1940s". Her family is not related to Bing Crosby. Her parents eventually separated, and her father relocated to Australia.

She excelled at tennis as a youth, starting the game at age 12. She was ranked as high as #7 in singles in US junior tennis competition and #4 in doubles, which she often played with her elder sister, Linda Lou, as her partner.

She graduated in 1968 from the University of Southern California with a degree in psychology, although she originally was pre-med.

Career
Crosby was a professional tennis player who played at Wimbledon twice, quitting the sport professionally sometime between 1967 and 1970.

As an actress, her first TV appearance was as Susan in the episode "The Lay of the Land" in the first season of It Takes a Thief (1968). Her first movie role was as Ann Chris in Michael Shurtleff's film version of his play Call Me by My Rightful Name (1972), opposite Don Murray and Otis Young. The following year she played Kay Butler in the 20th Century Fox crime drama The Laughing Policeman (1973) with Oscar winners Walter Matthau and Louis Gossett Jr.

In 1974, she starred as the title character in the television film Wonder Woman, a year before Lynda Carter popularized the role in the weekly series Wonder Woman.  In 1975, she guest starred as Helen of Troy in the scifi/horror series Kolchak: The Night Stalker. Crosby starred in the movie Trackdown (1976) with James Mitchum, the TV movie Keefer (1978) with William Conrad, and in Coach (1978) with Michael Biehn, in which she played the coach of a high school basketball team who falls for one of her players. 

She starred in the horror movie The Dark (1979), opposite William Devane, the 1982 TV miniseries World War III, with Rock Hudson and David Soul, and the TV movie Intimate Strangers (1986), starring Stacy Keach and Teri Garr. She also played herself in cameo roles in The Last Horror Film (1982) and Robert Altman's 1992 film The Player.

Crosby was a co-host of the TV series That's Incredible! from 1980 to 1984 on ABC, which remains in world-wide syndication.  In 1986, she was a guest commentator for the nationally televised special of World Wrestling Federation (WWF)'s WrestleMania 2.

Crosby starred as Judith Main in the 1994 TV miniseries North and South: Book III. The same year she appeared in the Lifetime movie Untamed Love (1994), based on Torey Hayden's One Child, and later starred in the film Ablaze (2001), opposite Ice-T and Tom Arnold.

Personal life
Crosby was married at age 21 to Alexander Wilfred Ingle on July 30, 1966; they divorced in 1968. She dated actor Richard Roundtree during the mid 1970s.

She was in a relationship with football star Joe Theismann throughout the early 1980s. Their romantic relationship ended in 1991, after which she sued him for $4.5 million because he "abandoned his promise to financially support her". Theismann responded with a countersuit, ultimately leading to both settling out of court.

She was briefly a follower of Scientology.

References

External links

 Official website
 
 
 

1944 births
20th-century American actresses
21st-century American actresses
American film actresses
American television actresses
Television personalities from Los Angeles
American women television personalities
Living people
Actresses from Los Angeles
Actresses from Kansas City, Missouri
University of Southern California alumni
American female tennis players
Tennis people from Missouri
21st-century American women